Pyrinia is a genus of moths in the family Geometridae erected by Jacob Hübner in 1818.

Species
Pyrinia elfina (Warren, 1894) Brazil
Pyrinia fulvata Warren, 1894
Pyrinia gallaria (Walker, 1860) Rio de Janeiro, Brazil
Pyrinia icosiata Walker, 1860 Tefé & Amazonas, Brazil
Pyrinia incensata Walker, 1863 Pará, Brazil
Pyrinia mimicaria (Walker, [1863]) Pará, Brazil
Pyrinia resignata (Guenée, 1857) Brazil
Pyrinia rutilaria Hübner, 1818 Suriname
Pyrinia sabasia Schaus, 1927 São Paulo, Brazil 
Pyrinia signifera Warren, 1894 Rio de Janeiro, Brazil

References

Ennominae